Bechtholdt is a German surname. Notable people with the surname include:

Carlos Bechtholdt (born 1969), Argentine footballer
Franco Bechtholdt (born 1993), Argentine-born Chilean footballer

German-language surnames